Chaukati is a village in Sindhupalchok District in the Bagmati Zone of central Nepal. At the time of the 1991 Nepal census it had a population of 2346 and had 539 houses in the village.  
 the population had become 2497 (1334 females and 1163 males) in 627 households.

References

Populated places in Sindhupalchowk District